Hugh Boyd may refer to:

Hugh Boyd (footballer) (1886–1960), Australian rules footballer
Hugh Boyd (writer) (1746–1794), Irish essayist
Hugh Boyd (politician) (1765–1795), Irish politician
Hugh Stuart Boyd (1781–1848), English Greek scholar

See also
Hugh Boyd Secondary School, Richmond, British Columbia, Canada
Hugh Boyd Casey (1925–1952), United States Army officer